Robert Renoncé (6 August 1912 – 12 December 1991) was a French racing cyclist. He rode in the 1935 Tour de France.

References

1912 births
1991 deaths
French male cyclists
Place of birth missing